Korra is the lead character of the animated television series The Legend of Korra.

Korra may also refer to:

Places
Korra, Tibet, a village in Tibet
 Various locations in India, including:
 Korra, Jehanabad
 Korra Bujurg Village, Banda
 Korra Village, Pashchimi Singhbhum
 Korra Village, Patna
 Korra Village, Muzaffarpur
 Korra Village, Visakhapatnam
 Chak Korra Sadat, Fatehpur

People
Korra Garra, an African writer and linguist
Monika Kørra, Norwegian author and athlete

Other
Foxtail millet (Setaria italica), a species of millet known in India as Korra

See also

Karra (disambiguation)
Kora (disambiguation)
Korha (disambiguation)
Khori (disambiguation)
Koda (disambiguation)
Khora
Quora